Ron Lamothe (born 1968) is a director of documentary films and the founder of Terra Incognita Films.

In 2000, Lamothe began pre-production on The Political Dr. Seuss, a documentary on the life and "political" works of Theodor Geisel. In 2004, the documentary aired nationwide on PBS as the season premiere of Independent Lens. It was subsequently nominated for a George Foster Peabody Award in documentary television.

Starting in 2005, Lamothe spent two years shooting and editing his next documentary, The Call of the Wild, on the self-proclaimed "aesthetic voyager" Christopher McCandless, a filmmaking odyssey that took him through thirty U.S. states, two Canadian provinces, and parts of Mexico.

Filmography
 The Call of the Wild (2007)
 The Political Dr. Seuss (2004)

External links
 Terra Incognita Films official site
 
 

American film directors
Living people
1968 births
American documentary filmmakers